Designated by the United States Congress in 1986, the Big Laurel Branch Wilderness is a  wilderness area within Carter County in the U.S. state of Tennessee.

References

Protected areas of Carter County, Tennessee
Wilderness areas of the Appalachians
IUCN Category Ib
Wilderness areas of Tennessee